Robert Parrella (born 9 June 1944) is an Italian born, Australian international lawn and indoor bowler.

Bowls career

Commonwealth Games
Born in Italy Rob came to prominence when winning a silver medal in the 1982 Commonwealth Games behind Willie Wood. Despite this success he fell out of favour with the Australian selectors and it was not until 1989 that he represented his country again.

In the 1990 Commonwealth Games he won the singles Gold and in the 1994 Commonwealth Games he won a bronze medal in the singles.

World Championships
He only competed in one World Outdoor Championship in 1992.

Asia Pacific Championships
He has won three gold medals at the Asia Pacific Bowls Championships in 1989 (singles and pairs) and 1991 (singles).

National
He has twice been Australian National Bowls Championships singles champion and four times pairs champion.

Awards

Other awards include recognition as Bowls Australia Athlete of the Year in 1989 and induction into the Queensland Sports Hall of Fame on 4 December 2009.

References

Australian male bowls players
Living people
1944 births
Commonwealth Games medallists in lawn bowls
Commonwealth Games gold medallists for Australia
Commonwealth Games silver medallists for Australia
Commonwealth Games bronze medallists for Australia
Bowls players at the 1982 Commonwealth Games
Bowls players at the 1990 Commonwealth Games
Bowls players at the 1994 Commonwealth Games
Medallists at the 1982 Commonwealth Games
Medallists at the 1990 Commonwealth Games
Medallists at the 1994 Commonwealth Games